Verstappen is a Dutch toponymic surname. The name is a contraction of van der stappen, literally meaning "from/of the steps". Notable people with the surname include: 

 Alessia Verstappen (born 2006), Belgian rhythmic gymnast 
 Annemarie Verstappen (born 1965), Dutch swimmer
 Eric Verstappen (born 1994), Dutch footballer
 Jos Verstappen (born 1972), Dutch racing driver
 Max Verstappen (born 1997), Dutch racing driver, son of Jos Verstappen and 2 times Formula One World Champion (2021, 2022)
 Nicky Verstappen (1987–1998), Dutch victim of homicide
 Wim Verstappen (1937–2004), Dutch film & television director and producer
Van der Stappen
 Charles van der Stappen (1843–1910), Belgian sculptor

See also
 12630 Verstappen, main-belt asteroid named after Dutch astronomer René Verstappen (born 1948)
 Verstappen v Port Edward Town Board, a 1993 South African legal case

References

Dutch-language surnames
Toponymic surnames